Lamasco is a former town, and current district, in Evansville, Indiana originally bounded by the present day streets of St. Joseph Avenue on the west, First Avenue on the east, Maryland on the north and the Ohio River on the south to Fulton (meaning Pennsylvania east of Fulton). Lamasco includes the Independence Historic District, which was placed on the National Register of Historic Places in 1982. Part of this historic district includes West Franklin Street, a retail and service center with a 100-foot-wide street that plays host to the annual West Side Nut Club Fall Festival.

History 

The west side of Evansville was for many years cut off from the main part of the city by Pigeon Creek and the wide swath of factories that once made the creek an important industrial corridor. With a heavy influx of German immigrants in the late 19th century, the west side became further isolated and developed its own culture, sense of community, and self-sufficiency. The land comprising the former town of Lamasco was platted in 1837. In 1839, this area was incorporated as Lamasco, a name formed from the last names of the proprietors of the town, John and William Law, James B. MacCall, and Lucius H. Scott. For twenty years, Lamasco and Evansville remained separate although their social and business interaction were as one community. In 1857, the area of Lamasco east of Pigeon Creek was annexed to Evansville while the part west of the creek remained independent and was therefore known as Independence.

Around the 1848 revolutions in Europe and after the American Civil War, massive German immigration increased the population of Independence, enticing Evansville to annex it in the spring of 1870. To counter the annexation, some residents proposed incorporating as a separate town with the name "Madduxport" after Alexander Maddux, a justice of the peace. However, by early summer, Independence was made a part of Evansville. "Independence" as a name stuck for some time but eventually gave way to the geographic designation of "West Side". In 1982, the Independence Historic District was placed on the National Register of Historic Places.

Demographics 

The community is known for its stable and industrious character, partially influenced by a massive influx of German immigrants in the late 19th century.

Landmarks 

The West Branch Library is one of two Carnegie Libraries built in Evansville in the style of Beaux Arts Classicism. It was completed in 1912. 

The Rosenberger Building located on West Franklin Street is a three-story brick block, encrusted with metal and brick decorative detailing built in 1890 for wholesale and retail grocer August Rosenberger. Later is because the Heldt & Voelker Hardware Store. It is now occupied by a popular bar and restaurant and decorated in the area's German style.

Further east from the Independence area, but still within Lamasco and visible from the Lloyd Expressway, is the Willard Library. It was built in Victorian Gothic style and was listed on the National Register of Historic Places in 1972.

References 

Geography of Evansville, Indiana
Tourist attractions in Evansville, Indiana